Tumor protein D52 is a protein that in humans is encoded by the TPD52 gene.

Interactions 

TPD52 has been shown to interact with TPD52L2, TPD52L1 and MAL2.

References

Further reading